KSEC (95.7 FM) is a radio station broadcasting a Mexican Regional format. Licensed to Bentonville, Arkansas, United States, it serves the Fayetteville (Northwest Arkansas) area.  The station is currently owned by La Zeta 95.7 Inc.

External links

Regional Mexican radio stations in the United States
SEC
SEC
Radio stations established in 1982
1982 establishments in Arkansas